Two-Buldi-Two is a 1929 Soviet film directed by Nina Agadzhanova and Lev Kuleshov.

Plot 

The film tells the story of circus performers during the Civil War.

Starring 
 Sergey Komarov
 Vladimir Kochetov
 Anel Sudakevich
 Andrey Fayt
 S. Sletov
 Mikhail Zharov
 Vera Maretskaya
 Nikolai Yarochkin
 Aleksandr Chistyakov
 S. Polyakov
 Vladimir Uralskiy
 Aleksandr Gromov

References

External links 

1929 films
1920s Russian-language films
Soviet black-and-white films
Soviet silent feature films